Raymond Yip Wai-man (葉偉民) is a film director from Hong Kong.

Filmography

Films 
 1993 The Kung Fu Cult Master - Assistant director.
 1995 Sixty Million Dollar Man - Screenwriter, Director. 
 1998 Portland Street Blues - Director.
 2000 For Bad Boys Only 
 2000 Those Were the Days...
 2002 Beauty and the Breast 
 2003 Anna in Kungfuland 
 2010 Bruce Lee, My Brother  
 2010 Lost on Journey 
 2012 Blood Stained Shoes 
 2014 The House That Never Dies 
 2015 Tales of Mystery 
 2016 Phantom of the Theatre 
 2017 Cook Up a Storm

References

External links
 
 Raymond Yip at hkmdb.com
 Raymond Yip Wai-Man at lovehkfilm.com
 Raymond Yip Wai-man at bfi.org.uk
 Raymond Yip Wai Man at hkcinemagic.com

Living people
Year of birth missing (living people)
Hong Kong film directors